Elvis Goes There is an American documentary television series hosted by Elvis Mitchell that premiered on February 4, 2019, on Epix.

Premise
Elvis Goes There features "the veteran journalist traveling with A-list filmmakers and actors to places of inspiration around the world, exploring how each location shaped their work and identity."

Episodes

Production
On November 28, 2018, it was announced that Epix had given the production a series order for a first season consisting of four episodes set to premiere on February 4, 2019. Executive producers were expected to include Elvis Mitchell, Cheri Barner, Simon Helberg, Jocelyn Towne, Cora Olson, Lydia Tenaglia, Craig H. Shepherd, and Toby Oppenheimer. Production companies were slated to consist of Wildline Entertainment and Zero Point Zero Productions. Those expected to appear in series included actors and filmmakers with subjects including Paul Feig, Sofia Coppola, Ryan Coogler, and Guillermo del Toro.

References

External links
 
 

2010s American documentary television series
2019 American television series debuts
2019 American television series endings
English-language television shows
Television series by MGM Television
MGM+ original programming